"Hate My Life" is a song by Canadian rock group Theory of a Deadman. It was released in October 2008 as the fourth overall single (third American single and fifth Canadian single) from their third studio album Scars & Souvenirs. The track was selected as BBC Radio One's Track of the Week for the week ending March 20, 2009.

Background and writing
According to Tyler Connolly, the band's lead singer, this song enables people to feel that no matter how bad their own life is going, that there is always someone out there who feels just as bad.

Music video
According to Theory's site, the video was shot on November 15, 2008. It was asked on the site, as a contest, for forty fans to star in the music video. It was filmed at the Warner Brothers Studio in Burbank, California. It was released January 9, 2009, on Yahoo! Music. It was directed by Bill Fishman.

At the beginning of the video, Tyler sees a hobo, and then he starts singing the song, the lyrics matching everything that is happening in the video. He complains about how he hates hobos ("So sick of the hobos always begging for change, I don't like how I gotta work and they just sit around and get paid"), he almost gets hit by a car ("I hate all of the people, who can't drive their cars...), we meet his wife, played by his real wife Christine Danielle Connolly ("I hate how my wife; is always up my ass...), a girl drops her bag of lingerie (Tyler looking at it interestingly), a construction worker's boss telling him off ("I still hate my job, my boss is a dick...), and when he sings the chorus, a sign comes down from a building reading "I Hate My Life." Then, Tyler jumps onto a parade float with the rest of the band, performing the rest of the song. Behind them travels a huge group of people, which include the hobo, the construction workers, and the others Tyler ran into.

Charts

Weekly charts

Year-end charts

Certifications

References

Theory of a Deadman songs
2008 singles
604 Records singles
Songs written by Tyler Connolly
Song recordings produced by Howard Benson
2008 songs